Andrew Roberts may refer to:

Andrew Roberts (historian) (born 1963), historian from the UK
Andrew Roberts (New Zealand cricketer) (1947–1989), New Zealand cricketer
Andrew Roberts (Northamptonshire cricketer) (born 1971), former English cricketer
Andrew D. Roberts (born 1934), historian; see Bemba people
Buckshot Roberts (died 1878), American frontiersman

See also
Andy Roberts (disambiguation)
Robert Andrews (disambiguation)